The Best Man is a 1964 American political drama film directed by Franklin J. Schaffner with a screenplay by Gore Vidal based on his 1960 play of the same title. Starring Henry Fonda, Cliff Robertson, and Lee Tracy, the film details the seamy political maneuverings behind the nomination of a presidential candidate.  The supporting cast features Edie Adams, Margaret Leighton, Ann Sothern, Shelley Berman, Gene Raymond, and Kevin McCarthy. Lee Tracy was nominated for an Academy Award for Best Supporting Actor for his performance and it was his final film.

Plot
In May 1964, former Secretary of State William Russell (Henry Fonda) and Senator Joe Cantwell (Cliff Robertson) are the two leading candidates for the presidential nomination of their unnamed political party. Both have potentially fatal vulnerabilities. Russell is a principled intellectual but his sexual indiscretions and lack of attention to his wife Alice (Margaret Leighton) have alienated her. He has a past nervous breakdown to live down. Cantwell portrays himself as a populist "man of the people" and patriotic anti-communist campaigning to end "the missile gap". He is a ruthless opportunist, willing to go to any lengths to get the nomination. Neither man can stand the other; neither believes his rival qualified to be president. At the nominating convention in Los Angeles, they lobby for the crucial support of dying former President Art Hockstader (Tracy). The pragmatic Hockstader prefers Russell, but worries about his indecision and principles; he despises Cantwell for his recklessness but appreciates his toughness and willingness to do whatever it takes.

Hockstader decides to support Cantwell until the candidate blunders badly. When the two speak privately, Cantwell attacks Russell using illegally obtained psychological reports obtained by Don Cantwell, his brother and campaign manager. Cantwell mistakenly assumed that Hockstader was going to endorse Russell. The  former President tells Cantwell that he does not mind a "bastard" but objects to a stupid one. He endorses neither man. The candidates try to sway undecided delegates, Russell appealing to their principles and Cantwell using blackmail. Russell finds out to his chagrin that Hockstader has offered the vice-presidential spot on his ticket to all three of the minor candidates, Senator Oscar Anderson (Richard Arlen), Governor John Merwin (William R. Ebersol) and Governor T. T. Claypoole (John Henry Faulk). One of Russell's aides finds Sheldon Bascomb (Shelley Berman), who served in the military with Cantwell and is willing to link him to homosexual activity while stationed in Alaska during World War II. Hockstader and Russell's closest advisors press Russell to seize the opportunity but he refuses to do so.

After the first ballot, Russell arranges to meet Cantwell privately but when Bascomb is confronted face-to-face by Cantwell, Cantwell angrily counters the charges. Russell threatens to use the allegation anyway but Cantwell knows Russell does not have the stomach for such smear tactics. As the rounds of balloting continue, neither man has enough votes to win though Cantwell holds a narrow lead. Cantwell offers Russell the second spot on his ticket but Russell shocks him by instead releasing his delegates and recommending they throw their support behind Merwin, who secures the nomination.

Cast

 Henry Fonda as William Russell, a former secretary of state whom Vidal based on Adlai Stevenson
 Cliff Robertson as Joe Cantwell, a sitting U.S. senator based on Joe McCarthy
 Edie Adams as Mabel Cantwell
 Margaret Leighton as Alice Russell
 Shelley Berman as Sheldon Bascomb, a former Army comrade of Cantwell
 Lee Tracy as Art Hockstader, the former president of the United States, based on Harry Truman
 Ann Sothern as Sue Ellen Gamadge, the party's vice chair
 Gene Raymond as Don Cantwell, Joe's brother and campaign manager
 Kevin McCarthy as Dick Jensen, Russell's campaign manager

 Mahalia Jackson as herself
 Howard K. Smith as himself
 John Henry Faulk as Governor T. T. Claypoole, another candidate
 Richard Arlen as Senator Oscar Anderson, a candidate
 Penny Singleton [credited but does not appear]
 George Kirgo as Speechwriter

 George Furth as Tom
 Anne Newman as Janet
 Mary Lawrence as Mrs. Merwin
 H. E. West as Senator Lazarus
 Michael MacDonald as Zealot
 William R. Ebersol as Governor John Merwin, a candidate

 Natalie Masters as Mrs. Anderson
 Blossom Rock as Cleaning woman
 Bill Stout as himself
 Tyler McVey as Chairman
 Sherwood Keith as Doctor

Uncredited (in order of appearance)

 Shep Houghton as Reporter
 Fred Aldrich as Delegate
 Gene Roth as Delegate from Pennsylvania
 William Henry as Reporter
 Rupert Crosse as Reporter

 Byron Morrow as Banquet Master of Ceremonies
 Colin Kenny as man at pool
 John Indrisano as Mobster
 Billy Beck as Guest at party
 Gore Vidal as Senator at convention

Character names are not indicated in the screen credits. The closing credits feature film clips depicting the faces and names of cast members Henry Fonda, Cliff Robertson, Edie Adams, Margaret Leighton, Shelley Berman, Lee Tracy, Ann Sothern, Gene Raymond, Kevin McCarthy and John Henry Faulk.

Tracy received an Academy Award for Best Supporting Actor nomination for repeating the role of Hockstader that he had originated on stage. Faulk was a Texas-based radio personality who was blacklisted during the 1950s and won a lawsuit that helped restore his reputation. Kevin McCarthy was a cousin of Eugene McCarthy, who became a presidential contender in 1968.

Production
It was Ebersol's only film and he does not speak. It was the first American film to feature the word homosexual.

Reception
Bosley Crowther's review of the film in The New York Times cited William R. Ebersol in the role of Governor John Merwin as one of those who "stand out in a cast that is notable for its authenticity". The film has 100% on Rotten Tomatoes based on 5 reviews. Ben Cosgrove of Time said, "Considering how ruthless the film is in dissecting the amoral machinations employed in virtually any national political endeavor, The Best Man is remarkable not for its scorn or its misanthropy, but for the even-handedness of its vision." Critic John Simon described The Best Man as "impure hokum".

See also
 List of American films of 1964

References

External links
 
 
 
 
 
 The Best Man at TV Guide (cut and heavily revised version of 1987 write-up originally published in The Motion Picture Guide)

1964 films
1960s political drama films
American black-and-white films
American political drama films
Films about elections
Films about fictional presidents of the United States
American films based on plays
Films based on works by Gore Vidal
Films directed by Franklin J. Schaffner
Films set in 1964
Films set in Los Angeles
Films with screenplays by Gore Vidal
United Artists films
United States presidential nominating conventions in fiction
1964 drama films
1960s English-language films
1960s American films